Marcel Bitsch (December 29, 1921, Paris – September 21, 2011, Toulouse) was a French composer, teacher and analyst. He studied at the Conservatoire de Paris and also was professor of counterpoint there.

Career 
In 1939, Marcel Bitsch entered the Conservatoire de Paris, where he studied harmony with Jean Gallon, counterpoint with Noël Gallon, musicology with Paul-Marie Masson, and composition with Henri Büsser. After earning his arts degree, Bitsch won the Second Prix de Rome in 1943 and First Grand Prix de Rome in 1945, both times with contemporary Claude Pascal winning the second position.

In 1956, Marcel Bitsch started tenure as professor of counterpoint and later fugue at the Conservatoire de Paris. In his later years, he mostly concentrated on teaching and analysing the music of Johann Sebastian Bach, producing analytic scores whose page layout was designed to convey the music's structural features. Among his students are Daniel Roth, Pierre Pincemaille, and Édith Lejet. He retired in fall of 1988.

Works 
Suite française for oboe and piano
Quatre variations sur un thème de D. Scarlatti for trumpet
Cahiers d'études pour la flûte - The published title for this collection is Douze Etudes pour Flute
Six esquisses symphoniques, 1949
La farce du Contrebandier, musical comedy, 1946
Le chalumeau d'or, ballet
Marvellous Dreams, Twelve easy pieces for the piano, 1947
Trois sonatines for flute and piano, 1952
Pastourelles for piano duet (10 pieces, 2 vols), 1956
Les plaisirs de Sully, 2001
Douze etudes de rhythme pour clarinette 1957
Douze etudes pour Cor 1959
Aubade for alto saxophone and piano, 1978
Fantasietta for trumpet and piano
Vingt études pour trompette ut ou si♭, 1954
Variations sur une chanson francaise, for horn and piano, ca. 1954
Concertino for bassoon and piano
Vingt études pour le Basson, 1948

His Douze études pour flûte are not only intended as studies for private practice, but also as brief concert pieces, as stated by flutist Jean-Pierre Rampal in the preface to the Leduc edition. The collection is dedicated to Gaston Crunelle, a former professor of flute at the Conservatoire National de Musique de Paris. Mr. Bitsch himself was a student and later a professor at the Conservatoire.

References 

1921 births
2011 deaths
Musicians from Paris
Male composers
Prix de Rome for composition
20th-century French musicians
Conservatoire de Paris alumni
Academic staff of the Conservatoire de Paris
20th-century French male musicians